This is a List of World War II vessel types of the United States using during World War II. This list includes submarines, battleships, minelayers, oilers, barges, pontoon rafts and other types of water craft, boats and ships.  this list is not complete.

Army 

Under the Army organization of 1940, the Army Quartermaster was charged with the responsibility of providing the Army with all water transport services except those specifically authorized; for the Corps of Engineers in river and harbor work, for the Coast Artillery Corps in mine planting, and for the Signal Corps in cable laying (the Army had no communication ships at this time). In March 1942, most of the transportation functions of the Army Quartermaster were consolidated into the Transportation Division of the newly created Services of Supply and later that same year, on July 31, the Transportation Corps was established.

Coast Artillery Corps Mine Planter Service 

The Army Mine Planter Service was responsible for the minefields of the Coast Artillery Corps' coast defenses. The largest vessels of the service were the U.S. Army Mine Planter (USAMP), which was equipped to install mines and associated control cables. Smaller vessels known as "junior mine planters" or "pup planters", were occasionally employed as mine planters, but they mostly served as freight and passenger boats for river and harbor duty with the Harbor Boat Service. In addition to the mine planters, there were distribution box boats, used for servicing the mine-cable distribution boxes and rugged utility boats called motor mine yawls.

Mine ships 

One example is:

 Wallace F. Randolph (MP-7) (ex FS-70)

Signal Corps

Cable ships 

One example is:

 USASPB Col. William. A. Glassford (BSP-2098)

Communication ships 

Army communications ships in the South West Pacific theater of World War II provided radio relay services and acted as command posts for forward elements ashore.

Surviving examples include:

 PCER-848
  (S-195, CSQ-1)

 Schooners
 Argosy Lemal (S-6)
 Harold (S-58, CS-3)
 Geoanna (IX-61, TP-249, S-382, CS-1)
 Volador (IX-59, TP-248, S-385, CSM-1)

Transportation Corps - Water Division

South West Pacific Area (SWPA) - Services of Supply (USASOS) 

Operated in the Southwest Pacific Area.

Small Ships Section 

As there was a need for a fleet of shallow-draft vessels that could navigate among coral reefs, use primitive landing places far up the coast of New Guinea, and land along the outlying islands. An "S" fleet under Army control was created using local Australian vessels crewed largely by civilian Australians and New Zealanders. It was a miscellaneous collection of luggers, rusty trawlers, old schooners, launches, ketches, yawls, and yachts.

Water Branch - Army Transport Service (ATS) 
The Army Transport Service (ATS), originating with the Quartermaster Corps in 1898 and continuing into Transportation Corps as a division, operated the Army's large ships, most of which were transports, but ATS also manned the Army's large cable ships.

 Troop ships

Troop ships  included the following.

Surviving examples include:

 USAT Agwileon
 USAT George Washington
 USAT Orizaba

 Sunk

 USAT Cynthia Olsen (sunk December 7, 1941)
 USAT Meigs
 USAT Liberty
 USAT General John McE. Hyde

 Cargo ships over 1,000 tons

Cargo ships moved freight around the world.

Harbor Branch - Harbor Boat Service (HBS) 

FM 55-130 Small Boats and Harbor Craft

 Harbor Vessels

The Harbor Craft Company is organized for the purpose of ferrying to shore cargo from freighters and transports arriving in theaters of operation. The vessels may either be riding offshore at anchor in the open sea or more likely, anchored in a harbor. Cargo from the ships is loaded by Transportation Corps port company personnel onto barges. Then tugs, tow boats, or marine tractors propel the barges to the shore for unloading. Any cargo too heavy for the vessel's gear to lift is handled by a 60-ton floating crane.

 B Barge or Lorcha
 BB Balloon Barge
 BBP Balloon Barrage Leader
 BC Cargo Barge (Med. 110'-130')
 BCS Cargo Barge (Sm. 45' - 60')
 BCL Cargo Barge (Large - 210' or more)
 BD Derrick and Crane Barges
 BDP Pontoon Derrick Barge
 BK Knocked-down barge
 BG Gasoline Barge
 BSP Self-propelled Barge
 BW Water Barge
 BTL Truck Lighter
 C Navy Type Launch (Obsolete designation)
 CL Landing Boat
 D Dory and Dinghie
 G Marine Tractor
 HA Hoisting or Retrieving Vessel
 JR Radio Controlled Boat
 J Launch up to 50'
 MT Motor Towboat (Sm. 26')
 MTL Motor Towboat (Large, over 26')
 OB Outboard Launch - Detachable Motor
 OBM Outboard Motor - Stationary Motor
 Q Launch, more than 60'
 R Rowboat
 TKL Tank Lighter
 V Speed Boat
 Y Tanker - 176'

 Cargo ships under 1,000 tons

Coastwise and inter-island cargo ships, sometimes known as coastal freighters.

 Small Boat Company

The small boat company provided regular coastal and island service to bases in the Aleutian and Pacific Islands to supply food and equipment transported by small coastal and inter-island vessels and water craft that were under 200 feet or under 1,000 gross tons of the following vessel types.

 Ferry
 Tanker
 Water Boat
 Motor Launch
 Seagoing Tug
 Freight-Passenger Vessel

FS-80 to FS-90 were merchant vessels refitted for wartime operation

Built during World War II:
 F-76
 FS-64
 FS-206
 FS-240
 FS-244
 FS-246
 FS-263
 FS-344
 FS-391
 T-57
 T-89
 T-147
 TP-225

Surviving examples include:

 LT-5 the only surviving Army vessel that participated in the D-Day Normandy landing.
 LT-152
 LT-638

Air Corps - Quartermaster Corps (QMC) boat service 

Late in 1943 all rescue-boat activities were reassigned to the Army Air Forces.

Unit Designation Chronology
 Air Corps Marine Rescue Service
 Quartermaster Boat Company, Avn. (note; Avn=Aviation)
 AAF Emergency Rescue Boat Squadron (ERBS)

Rescue Boats 

Rescue boats included the following.

Corps of Engineers

Rivers & Harbors Division 

Reorganized 6 June 1942 as Construction Division - Engineering and Operations branches.

Surviving examples include:

 Sergeant Floyd (towboat)
 William M. Black (dredge)
 Montgomery (snagboat)
 WT Preston

Troops Division 

The 1943 Engineer Field Manual described a table of organization and equipment for specialized types of engineering units. These included:

 Engineer Units, Combat,  with Army Ground Forces
 Engineer Units, Service,  with Army Ground Forces
 Engineer Units with Army Air Forces
 Engineer Units with Army Service Forces
 Port Repair Ship
 Port Construction and Repair group
 Engineer Amphibian Brigades

 Port & Harbor Rehabilitation

The engineer Engineer Port Repair ship is equipped with repair facilities that include a heavy crane and a machine shop and maintains channels and ship berths by removing sunken ships and other obstructions. It also maintains channel markings and other aids for pilots. It does needed work on docks and wharves in conjunction with engineer port construction and repair groups.

 Port Construction and Repair Group

The primary mission of the engineer port construction and repair group is to make ready for use the facilities of ports of debarkation in a theater of operations. and to perform work involved in improvement or expansion of such ports, exclusive of harbors. Its work is performed in conjunction with engineer port repair ship operations offshore.

The construction platoon consists of a divers' section under the supervision of an officer, as master diver. Enlisted personnel consists of marine divers and divers' attendants. This section does underwater work incident to construction of quay walls, wharves, piers, etc.

Surviving examples include:

 Junior N. Van Noy,  only one of the ten Port Repair Ships that was not a Maritime Commission type N3-M-A1 type conversion.

 Near-short units

The Engineer Amphibian Brigade, redesignated in 1943 as  Engineer Special Brigade provided personnel and equipment for transporting combat troops from a friendly near shore to a hostile far shore when the distance is not over 100 miles. The brigade resupplies these troops during the early stages of establishing a beachhead. The brigade can transport one division when reinforced by naval LCT boats.

 2+1/2-ton amphibian trucks,
 command and navigation boats
 tank lighters
 patrol boats
 surf-landing boats

 River crossing units

 Treadway bridge company

A Treadway bridge company is attached to an armored division in river-crossing operations to provide a bridge for heavy vehicles. Equipment included a steel-treadway bridge M1, providing a floating bridge about 1,080 feet long, or a steel-treadway bridge M2, providing a floating bridge about 864 feet long.

 Light ponton company

The company is attached to a division in river-crossing operations to provide bridges and rafts. Equipment included two units of M3 pneumatic bridge equipage or  two units of M1938 10-ton ponton  bridge equipment.

Their stream-crossing equipment included:

 One unit of footbridge, M1938
 Four ferry set, No. 1, Infantry Support
 Twelve raft, set No. 1, Infantry Support
 Seventy assault boats, M2

 Heavy ponton  battalion

The Heavy ponton battalion was attached to a corps in river-crossing operations to provide bridges and rafts capable of supporting heavier loads. Bridges and rafts are constructed of four units of 25-ton heavy ponton equipment, M1940.

 Airborne Engineer Battalion (pneumatic reconnaissance boats)
 Combat Engineer Battalion
 15 boat, reconnaissance, pneumatic, canvas, 2-man
 14 boat, assault, M-2, with paddles and canvas bag

Maritime Commission vessels 

Vessels operated by the Maritime Commission included Liberty and Victory Ships.

Liberty ship 

Surviving examples include:

 SS John W. Brown
 SS Jeremiah O'Brien, the only surviving Merchant Marine ship which was in the D-Day armada.

Victory ship 

Surviving examples include:

 SS Kingsport Victory
 SS Simmons Victory (end USS Liberty (AGTR-5))

Navy

Amphibious warfare type 

Amphibious warfare vessels include all ships with organic capability for amphibious warfare and which have characteristics enabling long duration operations on the high seas.  There are two classifications of craft: amphibious warfare ships which are built to cross oceans, and landing craft, which are designed to take troops from ship to shore in an invasion. Some vessels called "landing ships" did not have the capability to off-load troops and supplies onto beaches; they were just transports or command-and-control vessels.

Ships

 AGC: Amphibious Force Flagship
 class anewed (1969) too, LCC—Amphibious Command Ship
 AKA: Attack Cargo Ship
 APA: Attack Transport
 APD: High speed transport
 LSD: Landing Ship, Dock
 LSM: Landing Ship, Medium
 LSMR or LSM(R)—Landing Ship, Medium (Rocket)
 LST: Landing Ship, Tank
 LSTH or LST(H)—Landing Ship, Tank (Hospital)
 LSV: Landing Ship, Vehicle

 Landing Craft
 LCC: Landing Craft, Control
 LCFF, LC(FF): Flotilla Flagship
 LCI, LCIL or LCI(L): Landing Craft, Infantry (Large)
 class anewed (1949) too, LSI—Landing Ship, Infantry
 LCI(G)(M)(R)—Landing Craft, Infantry (Gunboat) (Mortar) (Rocket)
 LCM : Landing Craft, Mechanized
 LCP, LCPL, or LCP(L): Landing Craft, Personnel (Large)
 LCR, LCRS or LCR(S): Landing Craft, Rubber (Small)
 LCR, LCRL or LCR(L): Landing Craft, Rubber (Large)
 LCSS, LCS(S) : Landing Craft, Support (Small), an LCP(L) conversion, fitted with heavy machine guns
 LCS, LCSL or LCS(L): Landing Craft, Support (Large)
 class anewed (1949) too, LSSL—Landing Ship, Support (Large)
 LCT: Landing Craft, Tank
 class anewed (1949) too, LSU—Landing Ship, Utility
 class anewed (1956) too, LCU—Landing Craft, Utility
 LCV: Landing Craft, Vehicle
 LCVP or LCV(P): Landing Craft, Vehicle (Personnel)
 an LCV, fitted with 1/4 inch armor
 LCA—Landing Craft, Assault (British term for LCVP)

Other types 

Aircraft Carriers

 Fleet Aircraft Carriers CV
 Light Aircraft Carriers CVL
 Escort Carriers CVE

Battleships

 Battleships BB

Cruisers

 Large Cruisers CB
 Heavy Cruisers CA
 Light Cruisers CL

Destroyers

 Destroyers DD
 Destroyer Escorts DE

Submarines

 Submarines SS

Minesweepers

 Minelayers & Coastal Minelayers CM
 Light Minelayers DM
 Auxiliary Minelayers ACM
 Minesweepers AM
 Coastal Minesweepers AMc
 Fast Minesweepers DMS
 Motor Minesweepers YMS

Patrol Craft

 Gunboats PG
 Converted Yachts PG
 Frigates PF
 River Gunboats PR
 Smaller Converted Yachts PY
 Coastal Yachts PYc
 Escort Patrol Craft PCE
 Eagle Boats PE
 Patrol Craft, Sweepers PCS
 Motor Gunboats PGM

Submarine Chasers

 Submarine Chasers (Steel Hull) PC
 Submarine Chasers (Wooden Hull) SC

Motor Torpedo Boats

 Motor Torpedo Boats PT
 Motor Boat Submarine Chasers PTC

Auxiliaries

 Crane Ship AB
 Advanced Base Section Dock ABSD
 Advanced Base Dock ABD
 Destroyer Tenders AD
 Ammunition Ships AE
 Provision Store Ships AF
 Auxiliary Floating Dock AFD
 Large Auxiliary Floating Dock (non-self-propelled) AFDB
 Small Auxiliary Floating Dock (non-self-propelled) AFDL
 Medium Auxiliary Floating Dock (non-self-propelled) AFDM
 Miscellaneous Auxiliaries AG
 Amphibious Force Command Ships AGC
 MTB Tenders AGP
 Surveying Ships AGS

Hospital Ships

 Hospital Ships AH

Cargo Ships

 Cargo Ships AK
 Attack Cargo Ships AKA
 Net Cargo Ships AKN
 General Stores Issue Ships AKS
 Cargo Ships and Aircraft Ferries AKV

Net-Laying Ships AN
Oilers & Tankers

 Oilers AO
 Gasoline Tankers AOG

Transports

 Transports AP
 Attack Transports APA
 Self-Propelled Barracks Ships APB
 Coastal Transports APc
 High-Speed Transports APD
 Evacuation Transports APH
 Barracks Ships APL
 Mechanized Artillery Transport APM
 Transport Submarine APS
 Aircraft Ferries APV

Repair Ships

 Repair Ships AR
 Battle-Damage Repair Ships ARB
 Auxiliary Repair Dock (Concrete) ARDC
 Internal Combustion Engine Repair Ships ARG
 Heavy Hull Repair Ships ARH
 Landing Craft Repair Ships ARL
 Salvage Vessels ARS
 Salvage Craft Tenders ARS(T)
 Aircraft Repair Ships (Aircraft) ARV(A)
 Aircraft Repair Ships (Engine) ARV(E)

Submarine Tenders & Rescue Vessels

 Submarine Tenders AS
 Submarine Rescue Vessels ASR

Tugboats

 Auxiliary Tugs ATA
 Fleet Ocean Tugs ATF
 Old Ocean Tugs ATO
 Rescue Tugs ATR

Seaplane Tenders & Aviation Supply Ships

 Seaplane Tenders AV
 Catapult Lighter AVC
 Seaplane Tenders (Destroyers) AVD
 Small Seaplane Tenders AVP
 Aviation's Supply Ships AVS

Distilling Ships

 Distilling Ships AW

Unclassified Vessels

 Unclassified Vessels IX

Yard and District Craft
Coast Guard Cutters

 Cruising Cutters WPG
 Weather Patrol Ships WIX
 Weather Patrol Cutters WPC
 Icebreakers WAG

See also 

 Hull classification symbol
 List of hull classifications
 War Shipping Administration
 United States Maritime Commission
 Services of Supply
 World War II United States Merchant Navy
 South West Pacific Area (command)

References

External links 
 Dictionary of American Naval Fighting Ships
 SHIPS of the UNITED STATES ARMY
 Naval Vessel Register -NAVY SHIP CLASSIFICATIONS
  U.S. Navy Abbreviations of World War II
 Ships of the U.S. Navy, 1940-1945
 HISTORIC SHIPS TO VISIT - LISTED BY TYPE OF GOVERNMENT SERVICE
 NavSource Naval History
 Summary of Vessels Built in WWII, by Type
 Comparison of U.S. Army and U.S. Navy Vessels in World War II
 Army Ships—The Ghost Fleet
 History of US Army T Boats
 Hero Ships: LST
 Engineer Assault Boats in Canadian Service
 Amphibious Forces
  Air Sea Rescue Boats
This article incorporates text from one or more United States military publications now in the public domain.

World War II

+
Unit
Vessel Types